Wu Tieh-cheng (1893–1953) was a politician in the Republic of China. He served as Mayor of Shanghai, Governor of Guangdong province, and was the Vice Premier and Foreign Minister in 1948–1949.

After communists were purged from the Kuomingtang in the Canton Coup in 1926, Chiang negotiated a compromise whereby hardline members of the rightist faction, such as Wu Tieh-cheng, were removed from their posts in compensation for the purged leftists in order to prove his usefulness to the CPC and their Soviet sponsor, Joseph Stalin

See also
List of vice premiers of the Republic of China

References

Political office-holders in the Republic of China
1893 births
1953 deaths
Mayors of Shanghai
Governors of Guangdong
Chinese police officers
Taiwanese people from Jiangxi
Politicians from Jiujiang
Republic of China politicians from Jiangxi
Members of the 1st Legislative Yuan